The 2017 Women's International Tournament of Spain was the 21st edition of the Women's International Tournament Of Spain, held in Melilla, Spain between 24–26 November as a friendly handball tournament organised by the Royal Spanish Handball Federation as a preparation of the host nation to the 2017 World Women's Handball Championship.

Results

Round robin
All times are local (UTC+1).

Final standing

References

External links
RFEBM Official Website

International Tournament of Spain
2017 in Spanish sport
Handball competitions in Spain
November 2017 sports events in Spain